Bayt Nabala or Beit Nabala was a Palestinian Arab village in the Ramle Subdistrict in Palestine that was destroyed during the 1948 Arab–Israeli War. The village was in the territory allotted to the Arab state under the 1947 UN Partition Plan. Its population in 1945, before the war, was 2,310.

It was occupied by Israeli forces on May 13, 1948 and was completely destroyed by them on September 13, 1948. Village refugees were scattered around Deir 'Ammar, Ramallah city, Bayt Tillow, Rantis, and Jalazone refugee camps north of Ramallah. Some of the clans that lived in Bayt Nabala include the AlHeet, Nakhleh, Safi, AL-Sharaqa, al-Khateeb, Saleh and Zaid families. Today the area is part of the Israeli town of Beit Nehemia.

History

In the 1596 tax record, Bayt Nabala was part of the Ottoman Empire, nahiya (subdistrict) of Ramla under the Liwa of Gaza, with a population of 54 Muslim households, an estimated 297 people. They paid a fixed tax-rate of 33,3 %   on a number of crops, including wheat, barley, olives, fruit, as well as on goats, beehives and a press that was used for processing either olives or grapes, in addition to occasional revenues; a total of 8,688 akçe.

In 1838 Edward Robinson noted Bayt Nabala from the  tower in Ramle.
In 1870 Victor Guérin visited and found the village to have about 900 inhabitants. Socin found from an official Ottoman village list from about the same year  that   Bayt Nabala had   108 houses and a population of  427, though the population count included  men, only. Hartmann  found that  Bet Nebala had 118  houses.

In 1882, the PEF's Survey of Western Palestine described  Bayt Nabala  as being of moderate size, situated at the edge of a plain.

British Mandate era

The school was founded in 1921 and had about 230 students in 1946–47.

In the  1922 census of Palestine, conducted by the British Mandate authorities, Bait Nabala  had a population of 1,324 inhabitants; 1,321  Muslims and 3 Christians,  increasing in the 1931 census to 1758, all Muslims, in a total of 471 houses.

In the 1945 statistics, the village had a population of 2,310 Muslims, while the total land area was 15,051 dunams, according to an official land and population survey. A total of 226 dunums of village land was used for citrus and bananas, 10,197 dunums were used for cereals, 1,733 dunums were irrigated or used for orchards, while 123 dunams were classified as built-up public areas.

1948 war and aftermath
Benny Morris writes that the village residents abandoned it on Arab orders on 13 May 1948. However, according to Walid Khalidi, this cannot be confirmed.

The Palestinian historian Walid Khalidi described the village site in 1992: "The site is overgrown with grass, thorny bushes, and cypress and fig trees. It lies on the east side of the settlement of Beyt Nechemya, due east of the road from the Lod (Lydda) airport. On its fringes are the remains of quarries and crumbled houses. Sections of walls from the houses still stand. The surrounding land is cultivated by the Israeli settlements."

Culture
According to the Palestinian Heritage Foundation, Beit Nabala dresses (together with those of the village of Dayr Tarif), "were usually done on cotton, velvet or kermezot silk fabric. Taffeta inserts embroidered in Bethlehem style couching-stitch in gold and silk cord were attached to the yoke, chest panel, sleeves and skirt. In the 1930s black velvet material became popular, and dresses were embroidered in couching straight on the fabric with brown or orange couching embroidery which later became famous for this area."

See also
 Palestinian costumes
 Killings and massacres during the 1948 Palestine war
 Depopulated Palestinian locations in Israel

References
Notes

Bibliography

External links
Palestine Remembered - Bayt Nabala
Survey of Western Palestine, Map 14:    IAA, Wikimedia commons 
Bayt Nabala, Zochrot
Israel campaign throws spotlight on Jewish refugees from Arab lands, 28 September 2012, BBC
Bayt Nabala from Khalil Sakakini Cultural Center
Bayt Nabala, from PalestineFamily.net
Nabaly Net

Arab villages depopulated during the 1948 Arab–Israeli War
District of Ramla